General Chilton may refer to:

Kevin P. Chilton (born 1954), U.S. Air Force four-star general
Maurice Chilton (1898–1956), British Army lieutenant general
Robert H. Chilton (1815–1879), Confederate States Army brigadier general